Stacy Roest (born March 15, 1974) is a Canadian former professional hockey player who played five seasons in the National Hockey League (NHL) for the Detroit Red Wings and Minnesota Wild.

Playing career

He played the final nine seasons of his playing career with the Rapperswil-Jona Lakers of the National League A, the top league in Switzerland. He played in the Western Hockey League, the American Hockey League and the National Hockey League.

He captained Team Canada at the Spengler Cup in 2012.

He is currently Director of Player Development for the Tampa Bay Lightning of the National Hockey League, along with being the Lightning's Assistant General Manager and the General Manager of the Syracuse Crunch.

Career statistics

Awards and honors

References

External links

1974 births
Living people
Adirondack Red Wings players
Detroit Red Wings players
Grand Rapids Griffins players
Ice hockey people from Alberta
Medicine Hat Tigers players
Minnesota Wild players
SC Rapperswil-Jona Lakers players
Sportspeople from Lethbridge
Tampa Bay Lightning executives
Undrafted National Hockey League players
Canadian expatriate ice hockey players in Switzerland
Canadian ice hockey centres